Dastgerd (also Romanized as Dast Gerd) is a village in Tudeshk Rural District, Kuhpayeh District, Isfahan County, Isfahan Province, Iran. At the 2006 census, its population was 30, in 12 families.

References 

Populated places in Isfahan County